Guðmundur Hjaltason Halldórsson Kjærnested (29 June 1923 – 2 September 2005) was an Icelandic commander in the Icelandic Coast Guard and took part in all three Anglo-Icelandic Cod Wars.

Life 
Guðmundur died on 2 September 2005. He is regarded as a national hero in Iceland.

Honours 
 : Knight of the Order of the Falcon (17 June 1976)
 : Grand Knight (Commander) of the Order of the Falcon (17 June 1984)
 : Knight of the Order of the Dannebrog
 : Knight of the Order of St. Olav

References

External links 
 Guðmundur Kjærnested obituary 

1923 births
2005 deaths
Grand Knights of the Order of the Falcon
Knights of the Order of the Dannebrog
People from Hafnarfjörður